Duván Andrés Vergara Hernández (9 September 1996) is a Colombian professional footballer who plays as a winger for Liga MX club Monterrey

Career

América de Cali
On 16 July 2019, it was confirmed that Vergara had joined América de Cali on a one-year loan from Argentine club Rosario Central with an option to buy. In December 2019, América triggered the option and bought him free from Rosario for the 2020 season.

Monterrey 
On 8 July 2021, Vergara transferred from América de Cali to C.F. Monterrey on a permanent deal.

Career statistics

Club 

 As of match played 23 January 2022

Honours
Monterrey
CONCACAF Champions League: 2021

References

External links

1996 births
Living people
Colombian footballers
Colombian expatriate footballers
Association football forwards
Categoría Primera A players
Argentine Primera División players
Envigado F.C. players
Rosario Central footballers
América de Cali footballers
Colombian expatriate sportspeople in Argentina
Expatriate footballers in Argentina
People from Montería
Raya2 Expansión players